Douglas Carl (August 12, 1951 – August 17, 1997) was a state senator in Michigan who also ran as the Republican nominee in Michigan's 12th Congressional District in 1988 and in the 10th Congressional District in 1992, losing to David Bonior both times.

Carl served in the Michigan House of Representatives from 1984 to 1986 and in the Michigan State Senate from 1987 until his death.

Ronald Reagan attended a campaign rally at Macomb Community College in 1988 in which he urged people to vote for Carl.

Family
In 1983 Carl married Maria. They had one daughter, Colleen.

Carl's widow, Maria Carl, ran in the 2004 Republican primary for the Michigan House of Representatives against incumbent Leon Drolet after he voted against legislation defining marriage as a union of a man and a woman. She lost the nomination to Drolet.

In November 2015, Colleen Carl, the daughter of the late state senator Doug Carl announced her candidacy for Michigan House of Representatives in the 33rd District for the primary election that occurred August 2016.

References

Sources
political graveyard entry for Carl
bill to rename part of M-53 after Carl
bio of Maria Carl
Colleen Carl

1951 births
1997 deaths
Republican Party Michigan state senators
Republican Party members of the Michigan House of Representatives
20th-century American politicians
People from Almont, Michigan
Michigan State University alumni